Christmas in July, Christmas in Summer or Christmas in Winter is a second Christmas celebration held around the summer season, mainly during July. It is centered around Christmas-themed activities and entertainment, including small gatherings, seasonal music and specials, and shopping, with the goal of getting the public in the "Christmas spirit" during the summer season in the Northern hemisphere.

Origins
Werther, an 1892 French opera with libretto by Édouard Blau, Paul Milliet, and Georges Hartmann, had an English translation published in 1894 by Elizabeth Beall Ginty. In the story, a group of children rehearses a Christmas song in July, to which a character responds: "When you sing Christmas in July, you rush the season." It is a translation of the French:  This opera is based on Goethe's The Sorrows of Young Werther. Christmas features in the book, but July does not.

In 1935, the National Recreation Association's journal Recreation described what a Christmas in July was like at a girl's camp in Brevard, North Carolina, writing that "all mystery and wonder surround this annual event."

The term, if not the exact concept, was given national attention with the release of the Hollywood movie comedy Christmas in July in 1940, written and directed by Preston Sturges. In the story, a man is fooled into believing he has won $25,000 in an advertising slogan contest. He buys presents for family, friends, and neighbors, and proposes marriage to his girlfriend.

In 1942, the Calvary Baptist Church in Washington, D.C. celebrated Christmas in July with carols and the sermon "Christmas Presents in July". They repeated it in 1943, with a Christmas tree covered with donations. The pastor explained that the special service was patterned after a program held each summer at his former church in Philadelphia, when the congregation would present Christmas gifts early to give ample time for their distribution to missions worldwide. It became an annual event, and in 1945, the service began to be broadcast over local radio.

The U.S. Post Office and U.S. Army and Navy officials, in conjunction with the American advertising and greeting card industries, threw a Christmas in July luncheon in New York in 1944 to promote an early Christmas mailing campaign for service men overseas during World War II. The luncheon was repeated in 1945.

American advertisers began using Christmas in July themes in print for summertime sales as early as 1950. In the United States, it is more often used as a marketing tool than an actual holiday. Television stations may choose to re-run Christmas specials, and many stores have Christmas in July sales. Some individuals choose to celebrate Christmas in July themselves, typically as an intentionally transparent excuse to have a party. This is in part because most bargainers tend to sell Christmas goods around July to make room for next year's inventory.

Celebrations

Southern Hemisphere

In the Southern Hemisphere, seasons are in reverse to the Northern Hemisphere, with summer falling in December, January, and February, and with winter falling in June, July, and August. Therefore, in some southern hemisphere countries, such as Australia, South Africa, Argentina, Brazil, and New Zealand, Christmas in July or Midwinter Christmas events are undertaken in order to have Christmas with a winter feel in common with the northern hemisphere. These countries still celebrate Christmas on December 25, in their summer, like the northern hemisphere.

Northern Hemisphere
In the Northern Hemisphere, a Christmas in July celebration is deliberately ironic; the July climate is typically hot and either sunny or rainy with thunderstorms, as opposed to the cold and snowy conditions traditionally associated with Christmas celebrations in the higher latitudes of the Northern Hemisphere. Some people throw parties during July that mimic Christmas celebrations, bringing the atmosphere of Christmas but with warmer temperatures. Parties may include Santa Claus, ice cream and other cold foods, and gifts. Nightclubs often host parties open to the public. Christmas in July is usually recognized as July 25 but also sometimes celebrated on July 12.

The Hallmark Channel and its companion outlets (Hallmark Drama and Hallmark Movies & Mysteries) run blocks of their original Christmas television films in July to coincide with the release of the Keepsake Ornaments in stores, thus literally making the event a Hallmark holiday (an accusation that Hallmark Cards officially denies).

Every July, the television home shopping channel QVC has Christmas in July sales, mostly decor and early gift ideas for children.  What was once a 24-hour block of holiday shopping every July 25 (or the closest weekend day to it) has become a month-long event: generally, the sales begin on July 1 and are showcased throughout the day, with various blocks of holiday sale programming sales throughout the month. Generally during the last week of July, QVC will dedicate entire days to holiday sales.

There is also Christmas in June. In some western countries, July has a limited number of marketing opportunities. In the United States and Canada, for example, there are no national holidays between the first week of July (Canada Day on July 1 in Canada and American Independence Day on July 4 in the United States) and Labor/Labour Day (the first Monday in September for both the US and Canada), leaving a stretch of about two months with no holidays (some Canadian provinces hold a Civic Holiday, but neither Canada nor the United States has ever recognized a national holiday during that time). The late July period provides relatively few opportunities for merchandising, since it is typically after the peak of summer product sales in June and early July, but before the "back to school" shopping period begins in August. Therefore, to justify sales promotions, shops (such as Leon's in Canada) will sometimes announce a "Christmas in July" sale.

A Summer Christmas celebration is held on June 25 each year, in Italy and throughout the world.
25 June is 6 months before, or 6 months after (depending how one chooses to look at it), the traditional Christmas celebration.

It is celebrated at this particular moment, as a statement and a reaction to the traditional Christmas celebration: there is no need to wait for one specific day to celebrate love, friendship and peace. The movement started in Italy, Europe, where traditional Christmas is celebrated in winter, leading to the alternative celebration, 6 months later, to be celebrated in summer.
While it started out as an improvised summer celebration in Venice, it has now become a yearly tradition. In the last 8 years, the celebrations have taken place mainly in Sardinia, but the tradition is spreading across the world and becoming a worldwide movement.

In parts of Denmark people may have small Christmas celebrations and put up decorations for what is known as 'Jul i Juli' (translated as 'Christmas in July'). It is a simple play on words that has come to be celebrated by some, although it is not an official holiday.

Christmas in August (Yellowstone, USA)
In the 1950s, the Christmas in July celebration became a Christmas in August celebration at Yellowstone National Park. There are multiple theories concerning the origin of this celebration. Park employees, who were nicknamed "Savages" until the mid-1970s, were known to throw large employee parties in July complete with floats, skits, and dances. Some have speculated that the Christmas in August celebration was a way to extend the mid-summer festivities to the public and subdue the employee-only celebration. Another theory is that the celebration began as a way to incorporate a performance of Handel's 'Messiah' by a student ministry working in the park.

Christmas in July in September
Christmas in July in September has been marked as a celebration by some. For example, Parker, Arizona had a celebration for it in September 2020. While in the Philippines, Christmas celebrations begin four months early and run through the end of the year until Epiphany. Celebrations will unofficially start in September and run through months that end in "-ber" (September, October, November, and December).

Controversies 
Some notable philosophers, including Lil Baby, have claimed that Christmas in July is metaphysically (and even ontologically) impossible. If Christmas is in December, Christmas cannot also be in July, for that would imply a contradiction. This line of reasoning assumes that Christmas is an event in itself, however; intellectually-adept defenders of Christmas in July (such as Babytron) argue that, since Christmas is, in a sense, a spirit, there is no metaphysical constraint on when it is celebrated. Critics have failed to respond to this objection, although the American Philosophical Association is holding a conference to discuss this pressing issue.

References

Christmas events and celebrations
July observances
Unofficial observances
Winter festivals in Australia